So Many Partings is the third album by Silly Wizard released in 1979 on the Highway Records label in the U.K. and 1980 on the Shanachie label in the U.S. On this album the songs "The Valley Of Strathmore" and "The Highland Clearances" were written by Andy M. Stewart.

Track listing
"Scarce O'Tatties / Lyndhurst"
"The Valley Of Strathmore"
"Bridget O'Malley (Brid Og Ni Mhaille)"
"A.A. Cameron's Strathspey / Mrs. Martha Knowles / The Pitnacree Ferryman / The New Shillin'"
"Donald McGillavry / O'Neill's Cavalry March"
"The Highland Clearances"
"Miss Catherine Brosnan"
"Wi' My Dog and Gun"
"Miss Shepherd / Sweeney's Buttermilk / McGlinchey's Reels"

Personnel
Phil Cunningham -  Accordion, tin whistles, Overton low D whistle, Moog synthesizer, string synthesizer, acoustic and electric pianos, vocals
Johnny Cunningham -  Fiddle, vocals
Martin Hadden -  Electric bass, harmonium, guitar
Gordon Jones -  Guitar, mandola, bodhran
Andy M. Stewart -  Lead vocals, tenor banjo

References

1979 albums
Silly Wizard albums
Shanachie Records albums